The BL 7.2-inch howitzer was a heavy artillery piece used by the British Army throughout the Second World War.

History
In 1940 the British Army concluded that the only heavy howitzer available to it, the First World War-era BL 8-inch howitzer, had insufficient range for the conditions of the Second World War. As a stopgap the decision was made to re-line the existing barrels to a smaller calibre and develop a new range of ammunition to achieve the desired ranges.

Marks I–IV
To help counter this, two wedge shaped ramps were placed behind the wheels although the gun could sometimes still jump over them, presenting a hazard to crews. Marks I–IV differed only in the original 8-inch barrel used and the type of conversion; some barrels and carriages were also supplied from US First World War stocks.

Mark V
In 1944 several 7.2-inch barrels were placed in the US Carriage M1 used by the 155 mm Long Tom already in use by the British Army, becoming the BL 7.2-inch howitzer Mk V. Few Mk Vs were produced and it was never issued to batteries, as it was apparent that the Carriage M1 was capable of accepting greater recoil forces.

Mark 6
The BL 7.2-inch howitzer Mk 6 (there was a shift from Roman numerals) retained the Carriage M1 of the Mk V but had a new built 7.2-inch  longer barrel than previous marks, additionally a fifth charge was added to the ammunition. The Mk 6 was considered a highly effective gun and it was retained in service after the war.

Use
The original marks performed well. The first 7.2-inch howitzers were issued to batteries from mid-1942 and used in action in North Africa and later following the Normandy landings. In Burma they were provided as a pool of two guns per corps and used by Regiments as required. By the end of 1944, most of the earlier marks had been replaced by the Mk 6.

The usual gun tractor for the 7.2-inch howitzer in the early war years was the Scammell Pioneer, although this was never available in sufficient numbers and from late 1943 the Pioneer was supplemented by the Albion CX22S.

The BL 7.2-inch howitzer was usually employed in two four-gun batteries (alongside two four-gun batteries equipped with the 155mm Long Tom) of "Heavy" regiments of Army Group Royal Artillery (AGRA) units, providing heavy fire support for British and Commonwealth troops. The Mk 6 remained in British Army service until the early 1960s.

Indian Army service
In 1957, Indian Army raised 60 Heavy Regiment from the erstwhile J&K Bodyguard Cavalry. The unit was unique in its composition of four batteries with four Mk 6 BL 7.2-inch Howitzers in each battery, unlike the standard three-battery (six guns each) composition of other Indian artillery regiments. The guns of 60 Heavy Regiment saw combat in the 1965 and 1971 wars against Pakistan. In early 90's, 60 was converted to a field regiment and the guns passed on to 61 Heavy Regiment. The guns were finally retired from service by late 90's.

User units

 59 (Newfoundland) Heavy Regiment

 (Royal Artillery)
 1 Heavy Regiment
 32 Heavy Regiment
 51 (Lowland) Heavy Regiment –  North West Europe Campaign
 52 (Bedfordshire Yeomanry) Heavy Regiment  – North West Europe Campaign
 53 Heavy Regiment
 54 Heavy Regiment
 55 Heavy Regiment
 56 Heavy Regiment – Mediterranean Theatre and North West Europe Campaign
 58 Heavy Regiment
 60 Heavy Regiment
 61 Heavy Regiment
 75 Heavy Regiment
 171 Heavy Regiment
 114th (Sussex) Field Regiment – 2 gun section during Burma Campaign
 8th (Belfast) Heavy Anti-Aircraft Regiment – 2 gun section during Burma Campaign
 52nd (London) Heavy Anti-Aircraft Regiment – 2 gun section during Burma Campaign
 56th (Cornwall) Heavy Anti-Aircraft Regiment – 2 gun section during Burma Campaign
 67th (York and Lancaster Regiment) Heavy Anti-Aircraft Regiment – 2 gun section during Burma Campaign
 101st Heavy Anti-Aircraft Regiment – 2 gun section during Burma Campaign

 (Regiment of Artillery (India))
 143 Heavy Regiment Artillery (TA) (1951-1957)
 60 Heavy Regiment (now 60 Medium Regiment) (1957-1991)
 128 Hy Bty
 129 Hy Bty
 130 Hy Bty
 131 Hy Bty (later transferred to 106 Med Regt after one gun was put out of action)
 61 Heavy Regiment (1991-1996)

Gallery

See also 

 List of howitzers
 8 inch Howitzer M1 – US equivalent, sharing the Carriage M1
 203 mm howitzer M1931 (B-4) – approximate Soviet equivalent

References

World War II artillery of the United Kingdom
Field artillery
183 mm artillery
Weapons and ammunition introduced in 1940